Pielinen is the fourth largest lake of Finland, with a drainage basin area of  equally distributed between eastern Finland and Russia. The creation of the lake and its outlet is attributed to a post-glacial isostatic rebound, which resulted in uplift of the land. As is common in Finnish lakes, the lake's color is dark, due to the high proportion of bogs present in the catchment of the drainage basin that drains humic substances.

Pielinen Lake is in the northernmost part of Finnish Karelia in the region of North Karelia. It is adjacent to Koli National Park, known for its scenic beauty in summer, and winter skiing; and is near the whitewater rafting centres at Ruunaa Hiking Center,  Lieksa and Nurmes.

Geography

The water courses that drain into the lake are the Haapajarvi-Valtimojarvi and Saramojoki from its north-west direction, Viekinjoki River and Lieksanjoki River from the north-east side, and flows from the small drainage basin of the Juvanjoki River into the west. The lake has many islands such the Paalasmaa (27.2 km2), Kynsisaari, Porosaari, Toinensaari, Hattusaari, Koveronsaari and Retusaari. The lake drains, unregulated, southward through the Pielis River into the larger Saimaa Lake of the large Vuoksi watercourse, which is used for timber floating. The catchment of the lake is densely forested, particularly on its rugged western shore, which is capped by Koli hill. At, the point is the highest mountain in the catchment.

The shores have a diverse landscape including barren lands, rock faces, exposed soils and beaches. The basin area is inhabited by 83,400 people (41,700 rural and 41,700 urban population). The two towns in the basin are Nurmes, at the northern tip of the lake, and Lieksa on the eastern shore, which have a population of 18,700 and 11,500 respectively. The Koli National Park forms the western shore of the lake.

The wooded vegetation is mainly made up of coniferous forests (Pinus sylvestris, Picea abies), partly deciduous forests (Betula sp.) with the drainage basin categorized as belonging to the northern zone of conifers.  The herbaceous vegetation in marsh areas consists of various grasses (Poaceae), sedge (Carex sp.) and moss (Sphagnum sp.). The agricultural crops grown in the area are barley, oat, grass and potato, which are mainly used for feeding domestic animals. It is, however, reported that agricultural use is on the decline. The primary industries in the basin are related to milk, meat and wood. The secondary industries in the basin consist of cardboard, sawed goods, milk products and rubber products.

The periphery of the lake has a large network of roads and, during winter when the lake freezes, an ice road is the short route from one bank to the other.

Road 73 passes through the Uimaharju on the southern side of the lake and goes through very scenic spots to the east end. The south end of the lake has a lock system at Pielisjoki, which connects to the Saimaa Lake.

Climate
The climatic data has been recorded at the two major towns in the lake basin, namely the Lieksa and Juuka during the period between 1931 and 1960. The lake freezes, on average, during the period from 21 November to 14 May, according to records from the years 1960 to 1980.

Flora
The phytoplankton species recorded in the lake are Chlamydomonas spp., Monoraphidium confortum, M. dykowskii, Scenedesmus spp., Tabellaria flocculosa, T. fenestrata, Melosira sp., Mallomonas sp., Synura sp., Dinobryon sp., Merismopedia warmingiana, Anabaena flos-aquae and Aphanizomenon gracile.

Fauna
The fauna in the lake consists of eight types of benthos and ten types of fish species, out of which nine are economically important.

The benthos recorded in the lake are: Insecta – Dicrotenipeds pulsus, Glyptotendipens spp., Polypedilum pullum, Chaoborus flavicans, Stictochironomus spp., Tanytarsus spp. and Oligochaeta – Limnodrilus hoffmeisteri.

Salmon, which was previously endemic in the lake, is now extinct. Other fish species still found are: Perca fluviatilis, Esox lucius, Rutilus rutilus, Coregonus albula, C. mulesum, C. lavaretus, Lota lota, Abramis brama, Stizostedion lucioperca and Salmo trutta lacustris.

Water quality
The lake is categorized as mesotrophic. However, there are pockets of eutrophication zones. Bogs dominate the basin area, which causes flow of humic substances into the lake water. This has resulted in the lake water attaining a dark colour. This feature is said to be a typical characteristic of the lakes in Finland. Other parameters of chemical and physical properties of the lake waters measured relate to transparency (in meters), pH value, dissolved oxygen, COD, and concentrations of chlorophyll, nitrogen and phosphorus.

Uses
The lake is used for navigation, particularly for the transportation of timber; timber floated in the Pielinen Lake is estimated at 1.2 million tonnes per year. Other uses are as a fishery resource (the fish catch in 1981 was reported at 644 tonnes), fish products of vendace and burbot, and for recreational purposes to promote tourism. Swimming, sport-fishing and yachting are common attractions.

Threats
Siltation is not an issue.  However, toxic contaminants are regularly monitored including mercury, zinc, copper and DDT   to ensure that the standards prescribed under food safety standards, or tolerance limits for the safe use of water, are fully maintained. There is very limited pollution from sewage, municipal wastes and industrial uses, as adequate standards for sewage treatment and sanitary facilities are maintained.

Regulations
The basic National law that governs the lake and its basin is the Water law (1961, revised 1987) of Finland.  The governmental ministries and agencies of Finland responsible for the complete upkeep of the lake are the Ministry of the Environment, the Ministry of Agriculture and Forestry, and the National Board of Waters and Environment.

Attractions
Two major attractions around Pielinen Lake are Koli National Park and Paalasmaa Island.

Koli National Park

The Koli National Park is studded with islands, which are glorified in the Finnish national anthem as an important Finnish symbol. It was declared a National Park in 1991, after an intense debate between the environmentalist lobby and the owners of the land property over the location of the Hotel Koli, which stands at the top of its namesake hill. It is approachable by ferry from the mainland. A road link is also available to the hotel from the car park at the lower level. The highest point on the hill top is called the Ukko-Koli, which is linked to another peak called the Akka Koli. On the western side of Akka Koli is the "Temple of Silence," which is a place for meditation. There is stone altar here and a cross mounted on the rock. Another peak close nearby is known as the Paha-Koli and to its south is the scenic view point known as Mäkrävaara. The Koli Village, within the park premises, has the information office, Internet facility and a post office. The visitor centre at the park is called the Luontokeskus Ukko (Ukko Nature Centre), where exhibitions are held on the history, nature and geology of the park. It is one of the most accessible ski resorts in Finland. The hills here are covered with pine and birch trees.

The national park has nine basic huts and camping grounds.  There are also a marina and swimming beach on the shores of the lake, where a Finnish dancing stage called the huvilava stands.  Row boats are also available for rowing across the lake.

Paalasmaa Island
Access to the island is through ferry services. An observatory tower stands on the island; old houses that reflect the history of the island can be seen along a trail marked tornille (to the tower).

Ice Road
Pielinen hosts an ice road, during most winters, between the villages of Koli and Vuonislahti. The date of opening varies depending on the climatic conditions each year; the earliest the road ever opened was during the 2010-2011 winter, on the 15th day of December. Previously the winter of 1995-1996 had witnessed the earliest opening, on the 29th day of December. In the winter of 2009-2010, the road did not open until mid-January, whilst in 2008-2009 the road opened in mid-February. Helsingin Sanomat has stated that the road is probably the longest of its kind in Europe; however, this assertion is incorrect, as the Hiiumaa Ice Road in Estonia is 25 km, and is more widely believed to Europe's longest.

Popular interest
The asteroid 1536 Pielinen is named after the Pielinen Lake.

References

Juuka
LPielinen
Lakes of Lieksa
Lakes of Nurmes